James Anderson Geltz (June 30, 1900 – September 21, 1963) was an attorney and politician who served twelve years as a member of the Pennsylvania State Senate. A Republican, he was majority leader of that body during the 1941–42 session. He was previously an unsuccessful candidate for Congress in Pennsylvania's 30th congressional district in 1936, losing to Peter J. De Muth. Geltz lost his seat after being defeated by Robert D. Fleming in the 1950 Republican primary. He was pronounced dead at Presbyterian–University of Pennsylvania Medical Center after suffering a heart attack while attending a wedding at Saint Paul Cathedral in 1963.

References

1900 births
1963 deaths
People from Pittsburgh
Republican Party Pennsylvania state senators
Pennsylvania State University alumni
University of Pittsburgh School of Law alumni
20th-century American politicians